Prof. Maurice Alfred Gerothwol (13 February 1881 – 11 November 1941), was a British publicist who wrote on international affairs and Liberal Party politician.

Background
He was the son of B. S. Gerothwohl, city merchant and Stéphanie Vuillien. He was educated in Paris, Brussels and Heidelberg.

Professional career
Hansard, records that Geraldine Hodgson and French language Professor Gerothwohl had published "grave reflections upon the administration of Bristol university" and these and the resignation of Prof. T. R. Glover, D.Litt as a representative, were raised in Parliament as a pretext for a Public Enquiry on 1 May 1913. The enquiry was not authorised and Hodgson was dismissed in 1916.

He wrote numerous articles on foreign politics in the daily, weekly, and monthly press, on Education and French literature. He wrote numerous school and University French texts. He was Co-Editor of Lord D’Abernon’s Diary. He was London Diplomatic Correspondent to the Star and to Universal Service, USA.

Political career
Gerothwol was twice an unsuccessful Liberal candidate for Parliament.

His first campaign was for the Leicester West division at the 1924 General Election. He had success questioning the Labour candidate on their policy of a capital levy. This endeared him to Unionists and one local ward association actually urged their supporters to vote for him. However, the Labour candidate held on by just 737 votes.

He was then Liberal candidate for the Faversham division of Kent at the 1929 General Election. 

He did not stand for parliament again.

Publications
Nero in Modern Literature, 1905
Chatterton, a play in four acts, 1909

Honours and awards
Grand Officer of the Order of the Crown of Roumania
Commander of the Star of Roumania 
Holy Redeemer of Greece
Officer of the Crown of Belgium
Order of the White Rose of Finland
Knight of the Crown of Italy

References

1881 births
1941 deaths
Liberal Party (UK) parliamentary candidates